Ilona Tolnai-Rákhely (12 March 1921 – 23 September 2011) was a Hungarian sprinter. She competed in the women's 100 metres at the 1952 Summer Olympics.

References

External links
 

1921 births
2011 deaths
Athletes (track and field) at the 1952 Summer Olympics
Hungarian female sprinters
Olympic athletes of Hungary
Olympic female sprinters